The 1968–69 Shell Shield season was the third edition of what is now the Regional Four Day Competition, the domestic first-class cricket competition for the countries of the West Indies Cricket Board (WICB). The tournament was sponsored by Royal Dutch Shell, with matches played from 17 January to 6 March 1969.

Six teams contested the tournament – Barbados, British Guiana, Jamaica, the Leeward Islands, Trinidad and Tobago, and the Windward Islands. The Leeward and Windward Islands both played fewer matches than the other teams, although the results from their matches still counted towards the title. Three teams – Jamaica, Trinidad and Tobago, and Barbados – were undefeated (either winning or drawing all their matches), but Jamaica had more points than the other teams, thus winning their inaugural title. Barbadian batsman Robin Bynoe led the tournament in runs, while Guyanese pace bowler Philbert Blair was the leading wicket-taker.

Points table

Key

 W – Outright win (12 points)
 L – Outright loss (0 points)
 DWF – Drawn, but won first innings (6 points)

 DLF – Drawn, but lost first innings (2 points)
 DNC – Drawn, with both first innings not completed (0 points)
 P – Total points

Statistics

Most runs
The top five run-scorers are included in this table, listed by runs scored and then by batting average.

Most wickets

The top five wicket-takers are listed in this table, listed by wickets taken and then by bowling average.

References

West Indian cricket seasons from 1945–46 to 1969–70
1969 in West Indian cricket
Regional Four Day Competition seasons
Domestic cricket competitions in 1968–69